Aidan Power (born 30 March 1979) is an Irish television and radio presenter.

Career 
Born in Templeogue, Dublin, Power was educated at St. Mac Dara's community college and then Ballyfermot Senior College where he obtained a diploma in broadcasting and journalism in 1998. He began his career as a DJ and presented West Dublin Community Radio alongside reporting for RTÉ's daytime show 12-2-1. Aidan gained his radio presenting experience on the pirate Freedom FM.

Subsequently, Power worked as a presenter on a variety of shows such as Open House and The Den. In 2003, he left RTÉ and joined Nickelodeon as anchor presenter on their daily show NickL8R, but he left this show in 2004 to concentrate on co-presenting The Cafe with Laura Woods until October 2008 when he became the show's sole presenter. In September 2005, he became the face of TTV until July 2007. In September 2007, he co-presented one series of Class Act with Síle Seoige. He hosted Celebrities Go Wild with Anna Nolan in October 2007 In September 2008, he began co-presenting Winning Streak: Dream Ticket with Kathryn Thomas. He quit Winning Streak: Dream Ticket in 2009 to present behind-the-scenes show The All Ireland Talent Show Backstage.

In 2010, he started presenting SuperCrew on TRTÉ, and he began working on Celebrity Bainisteoir. He also presented the 98fm Morning Crew show with Clare Solan until the end of September 2012, after which he was replaced by Ray Foley.

Power presented Superbloopers with Zig and Zag on RTÉ over the 2011 Christmas season, and again during 2012.

On 13 April 2013 Power presented Sligo Rovers versus Cork City in a high-profile league of Ireland game.

Power co-hosted the only series of the Irish songwriting competition, The Hit with Nicky Byrne.

On 2 February 2016, iRadio announced that Power would present their new breakfast show. Power replaced Steven Cooper who left to present 98fm's breakfast show alongside former iRadio presenter Luke O'Faolain, the same show which Power left in 2012.

In 2019 Power had presented boxing on UK Channel 5Spike TV.

In 2021 and 2022, Aidan returned to Irish radio presenting on temporary multi city 90s and noughties station, Freedom FM.

Notable incident 
Power was surprised on 23 October 2008 when wrestling superstars Joe Legend and Scotty Too Hotty came in to talk about the wrestling events around Ireland but in a strange turn of events ended up taking on Power and trashing the Cafe. Power later admitted this was the highlight of his broadcasting career.

References

External 

1979 births
Living people
Dublin's 98FM presenters
Irish DJs
Irish game show hosts
RTÉ television presenters
Electronic dance music DJs